Apamea lateritia, the scarce brindle, is a moth of the family Noctuidae. It is found in much of the Palearctic. It is a sporadic migrant in Great Britain, where it is recorded from the east and south-east coasts.

Technical description and variation

P.lateritia Hufn. (= molochina Hbn.) (39 i). Forewing dull purplish redbrown, darker towards the costa; costal area and veins sprinkled with white scales; inner and outer lines double, lunulate-dentate, the teeth marked dark and light on the veins; claviform stigma absent; orbicular and reniform dark red brown with incomplete white annuli, the orbicular generally obscure and without white outline; submarginal line indistinct; the terminal area, except at apex, rather darker; hindwing fuscous, greyer towards base, with the cell spot and veins dark; — ab. borealis Strand, from Lapland, is still darker brown; — ab. derufata ab. nov. (39 i) is pale purplish red, without the dark redbrown tinge; — the form expallescens Stgr. (39 i),from Turkestan and Tibet, is pale reddish ochreous, flushed with brown or grey brown, the terminal area always dark brown; — ab. festiva ab. nov. (40 a), from Transcaucasia, rather smaller than expallescens, is pale brickred, somewhat roughly scaled; lastly, ab. sordida ab. nov. (40 a), a decidedly smaller form, is dirty brownish fuscous, with the inner and outer lines well-marked and approximated on inner margin; of this a fairly long series, all males is in the Tring Museum, from Pescocostanzo, Italy. Larva dull dark grey; the head brown; the thoracic and anal plates black. The wingspan is about 42–50 mm.

Biology
Adults are on wing from June to August.

The larvae feed on the roots of grasses.

References

External links

Lepiforum.de
Vlindernet.nl 

Apamea (moth)
Moths of Asia
Moths of Europe
Taxa named by Johann Siegfried Hufnagel
Moths described in 1766